The 2021 Torneig Internacional Els Gorchs was a professional women's tennis tournament played on outdoor hard courts. It was the tenth edition of the tournament which was part of the 2021 ITF Women's World Tennis Tour. It took place in Les Franqueses del Vallès, France between 25 and 31 October 2021.

Singles main-draw entrants

Seeds

 1 Rankings are as of 18 October 2021.

Other entrants
The following players received wildcards into the singles main draw:
  Marina Bassols Ribera
  Alba Carrillo Marín
  Claudia Hoste Ferrer
  Guiomar Maristany

The following player received entry using a protected ranking:
  Irina Khromacheva

The following players received entry from the qualifying draw:
  Darya Astakhova
  Celia Cerviño Ruiz
  Alina Charaeva
  Linda Fruhvirtová
  Daniela Vismane
  Yuan Yue

The following players received entry as lucky losers:
  Nicole Fossa Huergo
  Joanna Garland

Champions

Singles

  Maryna Zanevska def.  Ylena In-Albon, 7–6(7–5), 6–4

Doubles

  Irina Khromacheva /  Arina Rodionova def.  Susan Bandecchi /  Eden Silva, 2–6, 6–3, [10–6]

References

External links
 2021 Torneig Internacional Els Gorchs at ITFtennis.com
 Official website

2021 ITF Women's World Tennis Tour
2021 in Spanish tennis
October 2021 sports events in Spain